The Scotland national cricket team represents Scotland in the game of cricket. In 1992 Scotland severed their ties with the TCCB, and England, and gained associate membership of the ICC in their own right in 1994. They competed in the ICC Trophy for the first time in 1997, finishing third and qualifying for the 1999 World Cup, where they lost all their games. They also qualified for the 2007 and 2015 World Cups.

Cricket World Cup Record

World Cup Record (By Team)

1999 World Cup

1999 was Scotland's first appearance at the Cricket World Cup, and their matches against Bangladesh and New Zealand were played in Scotland. Scotland were drawn in Group B with Australia, Bangladesh, New Zealand, Pakistan and West Indies. Scotland failed to win a single match, and were eliminated in the group stages.

2007 World Cup

After failing to qualify for the 2003 World Cup, Scotland qualified for the 2007 tournament in the West Indies. Once again, Scotland failed to win any of their matches, and were again eliminated in the group stage.

Australia were put in to bat and made the seventh-highest total in World Cup history, It was nevertheless the third-lowest total in Scotland's ODI history and the third time a team had won by more than 200 runs in World Cup cricket. Ricky Ponting became the leading Australian run-scorer in World Cups, second overall only to Sachin Tendulkar. In reply, Colin Smith made his first ODI half-century on World Cup debut, and only ten men batted for Scotland; John Blain, one of two players in the eleven with previous World Cup experience, suffered an injury and was absent.

68% of South Africa's total was made up of boundaries, as Graeme Smith and A. B. de Villiers thumped runs and South Africa qualified for the Super Eights, and the result also confirmed Australia's place. South Africa bowled first, and after Fraser Watts and Majid Haq made it through the first ten overs, South Africa took a wicket every five overs to reduce Scotland to 84 for five after 30 overs. Andrew Hall and Charl Langeveldt took the wickets, but also got hit for runs by Dougie Brown, John Blain and Paul Hoffmann as Scotland posted their highest-ever World Cup total of 186.

Nevertheless, South Africa made their way to the total in half the required time, as Graeme Smith and A. B. de Villiers hit at a rate of more than eight an over. Scotland turned to their spin bowlers in the thirteenth over, with Majid Haq and Glenn Rogers taking three wickets, though they still cost nearly eight an over between them. Justin Kemp hit the winning runs with a six off Rogers.

2015 World Cup

After failing to qualify for the 2011 World Cup, Scotland managed to qualify for the 2015 tournament by winning the 2014 Cricket World Cup Qualifier. Scotland lost all of their group matches, and were eliminated.

New Zealand captain Brendon McCullum won the toss and put Scotland in to bat. Trent Boult and Tim Southee picked up two wickets each within the first five overs of the innings which left Scotland at 12/4. Both Matt Machan and Richie Berrington then scored fifties before being dismissed by Corey Anderson. Scotland's lower order offered little resistance and their innings ended in 36.2 overs at 142. Anderson and Daniel Vettori picked 3 wickets each for New Zealand.

In reply, New Zealand lost wickets at regular intervals from the start and were 66/3 in the 11th over. Kane Williamson and Grant Elliott put on 40 runs for the fourth wicket, before Williamson fell for 38. Scotland picked another three wickets in quick time to leave New Zealand 137/7 in the 24th over. Vettori scored an unbeaten 8 from 4 balls and New Zealand went on to win the match by 3 wickets. Boult was awarded the Man of the Match for his bowling figures of 6-1-21-2 in Scotland's innings.

See also
Scotland national cricket team
Cricket in Scotland

References

Cricket in Scotland
Scotland in international cricket
History of the Cricket World Cup